Appell is a surname. Notable people with the surname include:

Dave Appell (1922–2014), American arranger, producer, and musician
Olga Appell (born 1963), Mexican-American long-distance runner
Paul Émile Appell or M. P. Appell (1855–1930), French mathematician and rector of the University of Paris
Appell polynomials, a polynomial sequence named after Paul Appell
Appell's equation of motion, an alternative formulation of classical mechanics

See also
Apel (disambiguation)
Appel (disambiguation)
Apple
Apple (disambiguation)

French-language surnames